"Tight" is the only single released from The Best of INXS album by INXS. The song was written by Andrew Farriss and recorded by the band during the sessions for Welcome to Wherever You Are in 1992.

According to the liner notes from the UK album release, the song had been originally intended for Tom Jones to sing on.  However, following Hutchence's death in 1997, the track was reworked by the rest of the band in 2002.

B-sides
A number of different mixes of "Tight" were available on European, Australian and US editions of the CD.

Video
The video for "Tight" was a tribute montage, showing video and live footage of Michael Hutchence and the rest of the band.

Track listings
European CD single Mercury 063 885-2

 Tight (Remixed By Randy Nicklaus)	3:38
 Tight (Thick Dick Vocal)	7:50
 Tight (Dino Lenny Mix)	7:17
 Tight (Dan The Automator Mix)	4:20 (4:35)

Charts

References

2002 singles
INXS songs
Songs written by Andrew Farriss
1992 songs
Mercury Records singles
Song recordings produced by Mark Opitz